Marek Surin is a Slovak record producer, mixer, engineer, writer and musician

Discography

References

Living people
Year of birth missing (living people)